Chao Cheng-yu (born 29 March 1966) is a Taiwanese politician who is a member of the Legislative Yuan for Taoyuan 6.

Career 
Chao served three terms as a Member of Taoyuan County Council as a member of Kuomintang. He lost his primary in 2014 and subsequently became an independent. He ran for a seat in Ward 3, a five-member ward, for Taoyuan City Council and was elected with most votes.

He ran for a seat in the Legislative Yuan as an independent for Taoyuan 6 in the 2016 election with the endorsement of the Democratic Progressive Party (DPP). Though Chao is an independent, he caucuses with the DPP.

As a legislator, Chao has been involved in discussions about the Ministry of Transportation and Communications, general oversight of public transportation, and the National Communications Commission.

Legal judgements
In 2020, Chao was implicated in collecting bribes of tens of millions of yuan from a pair of funeral businesses. The following investigation revealed that in 2018, after receiving a bribe, Chao pressured officials from the Construction and Planning Agency to rezone nearly 20,000 square meters of land in the Yangmingshan National Park. Investigators launched a search of the legislator's home to find NT$9.2 million in "bundles of cash".  Investigators also photographed the Legislator's assistant Lin Chia-chi throwing a bag of money out of a car window that contained matching bills to the money found at Chao's home.  The Taipei District Court ruled in July 2022 that Chen had was guilty of tax evasion, sentenced him six months imprisonment or a fine, and ordered to pay NT$60,000.

Electoral record

Taoyuan city counciller, ward 3 
 Five seats up for election, 1 reserved for female candidate
 Eligible voters: 136,105
 Turnout (percentage): 87,424 (64.23%)
 Valid votes (percentage): 85,433 (97.72%)
 Rejected votes (percentage): 1,991 (2.28%)

2016 Legislative Yuan election 
 Eligible voters: 248,233
 Turnout (percentage): 167,257 (67.38%)
 Valid votes (percentage): 163,934 (98.01%)
 Rejected votes (percentage): 3,323 (1.99%)
 Incumbent is in bold

References

External links 
 Official Legislative Yuan page
 Legislator Facebook page

1966 births
Living people
Kuomintang politicians in Taiwan
Ming Chuan University alumni
Taoyuan City Members of the Legislative Yuan
Members of the 9th Legislative Yuan
Members of the 10th Legislative Yuan
Taoyuan City Councilors
Taiwanese politicians convicted of corruption